Katherine Hoover (December 2, 1937 – September 21, 2018) is remembered by the National Flute Association as an "artist—flutist, teacher, entrepreneur, poet, and, most notably, a distinguished composer". Her work received many honors, including a National Endowment Composer's Fellowship, an Academy of Arts and Letters Award in composition, the National Flute Association's Lifetime Achievement Award. There are two works where she cowrote under the pseudonym Kathryn Scott.

Her career as a composer began at a time when few women composers earned recognition in classical music in the 1970s. As shown in her list of known work, below, she has composed pieces for solo flute, mixed ensembles, chamber orchestra, choir acapella, full orchestra and many other combinations of instruments and voice. Some of her flute pieces incorporated Native American themes.

Early life and education 
Hoover was born in Elkins, West Virginia, on December 2, 1937. Her mother was a painter/artist and editor, and her father was a biochemist. Her family lived in Washington, D.C., then moved to Philadelphia during World War II. She attended school in Philadelphia.

She remembered hearing Mozart's music on a record player when she was three years old. She also recalled reading music as early as four years old, before she could read words. Her parents supported her artistic interests, rescuing a piano being disposed of by a neighbor and starting her at piano lessons at five years old. She began flute lessons at age eight. During this time, she discovered that she had perfect pitch. During interviews, she has shared she received "mediocre music instruction" during her early years.

Hoover began her academic studies at the University of Rochester in 1955. After two years of general studies she was accepted to Eastman School of Music, where she studied with flutist Joseph Mariano, and began studying composition. She graduated with a Bachelor of Music in Music Theory and a Performer's Certificate in Flute in 1959. Unfortunately, her composition classes left a bad impression. Hoover comments, "There were no women involved with composition at all. [I got] rather discouraged – being the only woman in my classes, not being paid attention to and so forth."

Hoover attended the Yale Summer Sessions in 1960 and 1961, where she studied flute, theory, and composition. During this time, she also studied with flutist William Kincaid in Philadelphia. She later wrote that she owed " much of her success to her mentor, William Kincaid, teaching her more about music than any other composer".

Teaching career 
From 1962–1969, Hoover taught flute at the Juilliard Preparatory School as well as a few other small schools, including the Third Street Music School. It was at the Third Street Music School that she received her first positive experience as a composer. She was asked to compose a piece for a school concert, a duet for violins, which was very well received. She married John Schwab in 1964. They divorced after eight years.

Manhattan School of Music 
In 1969, Hoover began teaching flute and theory at the Manhattan School of Music. She shared that, as a theory teacher she learned a great deal about compositional techniques, as it forced her to carefully analyze a wide spectrum of music scores. Also, during this time at Manhattan, she continued her graduate studies and received her Master of Music in Music Theory in 1974. It was also where she studied how other people identify with sounds.  She was a faculty member of Manhattan School of Music for seventeen years.

Teachers College, Columbia University
Hoover became a faculty member at the Teachers College, Columbia University (1984-1989), where she taught theory and composition to graduate students.

Compositions
The first publication of her work was Three Carols (1972) for choir and flute, published by Carl Fischer.

Hoover was honored as a finalist for the Kennedy Center Friedheim Award's Outstanding New American Chamber Work award (1978). Her successes continued, becoming a finalist once again and being awarded a National Endowment for the Arts Composer's Fellowship (1979).

Of her compositions she wrote "I have feelings of pride for the successes writing works for specific performers using other instruments...Stitch-te Naku for Cello and Orchestra, for cellist Sharon Robinson and [the] Clarinet Concerto, for jazz clarinetist Eddie Daniels."

Hoover co-founded Papagena Press in 1988 with her husband (Richard Goodwin, whom she married in 1985) to publish her works. The first piece to be published was Kokopeli (1990), a work for solo flute inspired by the Hopi tribe and the American Southwest. It won the National Flute Association's Newly Published Music Competition (1991). This was Hoover's second of six NFA Newly Published Music awards. She wrote that "Out of all of my achievements in music, I was overcome with the success of Kokopeli."

The composer John Corigliano wrote of her: "Katherine Hoover is an extraordinary composer. She has a wide and fascinating vocabulary which she uses with enormous skill. Her music is fresh and individual. It is dazzlingly crafted and will reach an audience as it provides interest to the professional musician. I do not know why her works are not yet being played by the major institutions of this country, but I am sure that she will attain the status she deserves in time. She is just too good not to be recognized, and I predict that her time will come soon."

Promoting women in music 
Hoover was involved with women's arts organizations and has worked to bring the works of women composers to the public's notice. She began work with the Women's Inter-Art Center in New York (1977. Here she organized Festivals I, II, and III of Women's Music which presented music by 55 historical and contemporary women composers.

She was the composer in residence for the Fourth Festival of Women Composers at Indiana University of Pennsylvania (1996).

Poetry 
Hoover had always written poetry since her youth finding both a striking difference and similarity between music and words. "This Way About"(2015). was her first book of poetry where she shares glimpses into her life.

Honors and awards
 Member Laureate, Sigma Alpha Iota
 Kennedy Center Friedheim Award, Outstanding New American Chamber Work, finalist, 1978, 1979
 National Endowment for the Arts Composer's Fellowship, 1979
 National Flute Association Newly Published Music Competition, 1987, 1991, 1993, 1994, 2006, 2020(co-winner)
 New York State Music Teachers' Association, Composer of the Year, 1989
 American Academy of Arts and Letters Academy Award in Composition, 1994
 New York Flute Club Tribute Concert for Katherine Hoover, 2013
 National Flute Association Lifetime Achievement Award, 2016
Global Music Awards, Silver Medalist, May 2018

Known works, chronological 
The citations included in the following table provide full disclosure and accuracy. In some cases, new sources document Hoover's rearrangements for changes to instrumentation. Hoover has also cited individual movements.

Discography
As a flutist, Hoover has performed other compossers works, as well as her own. The following is a selected list of her recorded performances.

References

External links 
 
 Katherine Hoover at AllMusic
 Katherine Hoover at Discogs
Katherine Hoover at Musicalics, The Classical Composers Database
 Thesis/dissertation, M.M. Manhattan School of Music 1972
 
 Thesis/dissertation, Research project (D.M.A.)--University of Illinois at Urbana-Champaign, 1994.
 

1937 births
2018 deaths
American music educators
American women music educators
American women classical composers
American classical composers
American flautists
Women conductors (music)
Eastman School of Music alumni
Manhattan School of Music alumni
Manhattan School of Music faculty
People from Elkins, West Virginia
Musicians from West Virginia
Musicians from Philadelphia
Women flautists
Teachers College, Columbia University faculty
20th-century classical composers
20th-century American women musicians
20th-century American composers
21st-century classical composers
21st-century American women musicians
21st-century American composers
Classical musicians from Pennsylvania
20th-century American conductors (music)
20th-century women composers
21st-century women composers
American women academics
20th-century flautists
21st-century flautists
Pseudonyms